Jack Hughes may refer to:

Jack Hughes (ice hockey, born 1890) (1890–1962), Canadian ice hockey centre and coach
Jack Hughes (ice hockey, born 1957), retired American ice hockey forward
Jack Hughes (ice hockey, born 2001), American ice hockey forward
Jack Hughes (footballer, born 1866), English footballer
Jack Hughes (footballer, born 1912), English footballer
Jack Hughes (rugby league) (born 1992), English rugby player
Jack Hughes (trade unionist) (1910–1998), Australian trade unionist and communist

See also
John Hughes (disambiguation)